The Trance is an album by American jazz saxophonist Booker Ervin featuring performances recorded in 1965 for the Prestige label, with Jaki Byard on piano, Reggie Workman on bass, and Alan Dawson on drums.

Reception
The Allmusic review by Al Campbell awarded the album 4 stars and stated: "Ervin's inspired exploratory tenor flights are consistently stirring, punctuated with piercing blues. The Trance delivers further documentation of Ervin's endless tenor inventiveness".

Track listing
All compositions by Booker Ervin except as indicated
 "The Trance" – 19:39 
 "Speak Low" (Ogden Nash, Kurt Weill) – 15:09 
 "Groovin' at the Jamboree" – 6:38 
Recorded in Munich, Germany on October 27, 1965.

Personnel
Booker Ervin – tenor saxophone 
Jaki Byard – piano
Reggie Workman – bass
Alan Dawson – drums

References

Prestige Records albums
Booker Ervin albums
1965 albums